Noor is a 2022-2023 Pakistani television serieal directed by Shaqielle Khan and produced by Wajahat Rauf and Shazia Wajahat under their production banner "Showcase Productions". It stars Romaisa Khan, Aijaz Aslam, Shahroz Sabzwari, Faizan Shaikh and Zainab Qayyum in leading roles.

Cast
Shehroze Sabzwari
Romaisa Khan
Faizan Shaikh
Aijaz Aslam
Zainab Qayyum
Emaan Zaidi
Mujtaba Abbas
Shazia Qaiser
Farah Nadeem
Mehru Saqib
Nahida Shamim

References

Pakistani television series